Labeobarbus ruasae is a species of ray-finned fish in the  family Cyprinidae. It is found only in Rwanda.
Its natural habitat is rivers. It is threatened by habitat loss.

References

ruasae
Fish described in 1914
Taxonomy articles created by Polbot